Life Short Call Now is the 23rd studio album by Canadian singer/songwriter Bruce Cockburn. It was released in 2006 by True North Records. The album featured a 27-piece string section and guest appearances by Ron Sexsmith, Ani Difranco and Hawksley Workman on backing vocals.

Reception

In a review for AllMusic, critic Thom Jurek wrote the album "Those who have followed his career over the past four decades wondered where he would go next, or indeed if there was anywhere he could go. The question has been answered in spades on Life Short Call Now... Life Short Call Now is absent of metonymy or metaphor; it reports from the inside what is, and what should never be with balance, as well as yearning for convergence." Michael Keefe of PopMatters wrote Cockburn "continues to grow as an artist and to remain relevant as an observer of this rickety old world in which we live." and summarized there are "several standout songs on Life Short, but a few lackluster tracks keep the album just beyond the reach of the upper echelon of Bruce Cockburn releases."

Track listing

(All songs by Bruce Cockburn except where indicated)
"Life Short Call Now" – 5:32
"See You Tomorrow" – 4:20
"Mystery" – 5:50
"Beautiful Creatures" – 5:09
"Peace March" – 3:32
"Slow Down Fast" – 3:39
"Tell the Universe" (Bruce Cockburn, Julie Wolf, Ben Riley, Steve Lucas) – 5:14
"This is Baghdad" – 6:21
"Jerusalem Poker" – 5:33
"Different When It Comes to You" – 2:50
"To Fit in My Heart" – 6:06
"Nude Descending a Staircase" – 4:23

Personnel
Bruce Cockburn – vocals, guitars
Gary Craig – drums, percussion
David Piltch – acoustic and electric bass
Julie Wolf – piano, harmonium, wurlitzer, Fender Rhodes, B3, accordion, melodica
Jonathan Goldsmith – celeste, glockenspiel, maikotron, piano ("Mystery"), Fender Rhodes ("Nude Descending a Staircase")
Kevin Turcotte – flugelhorn, trumpet

Additional musicians

Ron Sexsmith –  background vocals ("Mystery")
Hawksley Workman –  background vocals ("Mystery", "Slow Down Fast")
Damhnait Doyle –  background vocals ("Mystery", "Life Short Call Now", "Different When It Comes to You")
Ani Difranco –  background vocals ("See You Tomorrow")
Julie Wolf –  background vocals ("Tell the Universe", "To Fit in My Heart")
String Orchestra:
Violas: Parmela Attariwala, Virginia Barron, Caroline Blackwell, Johnthan Craig, Steve Dann, Kathleen Kajioka, Jeewon Kim, Gary Labovitz, Teng Li, Nick Papadakis, Douglas Perry, Anna Redekop, Christopher Redfield, Angela Rudden, Beverly Spotton, Scott St. John, Josef Tamir, David Willms

Cellos: Maurizio Baccante, Roman Borys, Matt Brubeck, David Hetherington, John Marshman, Paul Widner, Winona Zelenka
Basses: Roberto Occhipinti, Charles Elliot
 Dan Parr – score [preparation
 Jeff McMurrich – string recording engineer
 Dennis Patterson – assistant string recording engineer
 Pete Lawlor – assistant string recording engineer

References

2006 albums
Bruce Cockburn albums
True North Records albums